Neither by Day nor by Night is a 1972 Israeli-American drama film directed by Steven Hilliard Stern. It was entered into the 22nd Berlin International Film Festival. The film received two awards: 1) Best script, awarded by International Writer's Union, and, 2) C.I.D.A.L.C prize, for "understanding between peoples".

Cast
 Haim Anitar as Akiva
 Misha Asherov as Doctor
 Miriam Bernstein-Cohen as Sokolova
 Eli Cohen as Reuven
 Dalia Friedland as Nurse
 Zvika Gold
 Zalman King as Adam
 Gita Luka
 Edward G. Robinson as Father
 David Smadar as kibbutz driver
 Mona Zilberstein as Adam's girlfriend

See also
 List of American films of 1972

References

External links

1972 films
1972 drama films
1972 independent films
English-language Israeli films
Israeli independent films
Films directed by Steven Hilliard Stern
American independent films
1970s English-language films
1970s American films